Jivina may refer to any of these places in the Czech Republic:

Jivina (Beroun District), a village in the Central Bohemian Region
Jivina (Mladá Boleslav District), a village in the Central Bohemian Region